Oliver Shanti (born Ulrich Schulz 16 November 1948 in Hamburg, Germany), also known as Oliver Serano-Alve, was a New Age musician, best known for his work with the bands "Inkarnation" and "Oliver Shanti & Friends".

After having attempted suicide during his pre-trial custody, In 2009, Shanti was sentenced to a 6-year and 10 months prison term in Germany having been convicted on charges of child sexual abuse. The remainder of "Oliver Shanti & Friends" continued performing and recording as "Existence", with another "Inkarnation" co-founder Margot Reisinger replacing Shanti.

He is reported to have died during his prison sentence.
He died in March 2016 at the age of 67.

Discography 
Main:
1987 - Licht-Prakash-Light (as Inkarnation)
1987 - Frieden-Shanti-Peace (as Inkarnation)
1987 - Listening to the Heart
1988 - Rainbow Way
1988 - Vila Nova Mellow Days (as Oliver Serano-Alve)
1989 - Walking on the Sun
1990 - Minho Valley Fantasies (as Oliver Serano-Alve)
1992 - Vida para Vida (as Oliver Serano-Alve)
1993 - Soft Motion Vol.1 (as Oliver Serano-Alve)
1993 - Tai Chi
1995 - Well Balanced
1996 - Tai Chi Too
1997 - Circles of Life: The Best of Oliver Shanti & Friends (compilation album including 3 new tracks)
1998 - Seven Times Seven
2000 - Medicine Power
2002 - Alhambra
2006 - Man Heaven Earth (compilation album featuring 2 tracks by "Existence" and Dahmani)

Projects:
1996 - Buddha and Bonsai Vol. 1
1997 - Shaman
2000 - Buddha and Bonsai Vol. 3
2000 - Shaman 2

Thematical compilations:
Indiens: Sacred Spirits
Shaman: Red Indian Chill
1997 - Spirit of Budo: The Power of Balance
1997 - 10 Years of Sattva Music
1998 - Meditative Music of Budo-Gala: The Magic of Martial Arts
1999 - Tibetiya (including 3 new tracks by Oliver Shanti)
2001 - 15 Years of Sattva Music
2001 - Reiki: Brightness Healing

Other:
2008 single - Oliver Shanti feat. N.i.M.i - Roo Be Asemoon (Olugu Zamba Remix)
2010 single - Oliver Shanti feat. DJ Sunf - The Tree (rmx)

Conviction for child sexual abuse 
In 2002, a warrant for his arrest was issued in Germany, with a €3000 reward offered, on suspicion of his having committed child sexual abuse.
Shanti went missing at that time, and was reported  to be living secretly in Germany or its adjacent countries. He was arrested in Lisbon, Portugal, on 29 June 2008, and charged with 314 cases of child abuse on 20 April 2009.
After having attempted suicide during his pre-trial custody, "Oliver Shanti" was sentenced to six years and 10 months in prison on Friday, December 4, 2009 - after a Munich court convicted him of 76 counts of child sexual abuse.

References

German male musicians
New-age musicians
1948 births
2010s deaths
German people convicted of child sexual abuse